The 1935 Richmond Spiders football team was an American football team that represented the University of Richmond as a member of the Virginia Conference during the 1935 college football season. In their second season under head coach Glenn Thistlethwaite, Richmond compiled a 3–3–3 record.

Schedule

References

Richmond
Richmond Spiders football seasons
Richmond Spiders football